The 1994 IIHF European U18 Championship was the twenty-seventh playing of the IIHF European Junior Championships.

Group A
Played from April 17 to the 24th in Jyväskylä, Finland.

First round 
Group 1

Group 2

Final round
Championship round

Placing round

Poland was relegated to Group B for 1995.

Tournament Awards
Top Scorer  Dmitri Klevakin (13 points)
Top Goalie: Tomáš Vokoun
Top Defenceman:Mattias Öhlund
Top Forward: Johan Davidsson

Group B
Played from March 28 until April 3, 1994, in Székesfehérvár, Hungary.

First round 
Group

Group 2

Final round
Championship round

Placing round

Belarus was promoted to Group A and Spain was relegated to Group C1 for 1995.

Group C 
Played from March 18 to the 27th, 1994 in Bled, Slovenia.

First round
Group 1

Group 2

Final round 
Championship round

Placing round

9th place

Slovakia was promoted to Group B for 1995.  Lithuania, Croatia, the Netherlands, and Bulgaria were in essence relegated, as Group C would be divided into two tiers for 1995.

References

Complete results

Junior
IIHF European Junior Championship tournament
Sport in Jyväskylä
Junior
International ice hockey competitions hosted by Finland
April 1994 sports events in Europe
March 1994 sports events in Europe
Sport in Bled
Junior
International ice hockey competitions hosted by Slovenia
International ice hockey competitions hosted by Hungary
Junior
Sport in Székesfehérvár